Torness nuclear power station is a nuclear power station located approximately  east of Edinburgh at Torness Point near Dunbar in East Lothian, Scotland. It was the last of the United Kingdom's second generation nuclear power plants to be commissioned. Construction of this facility began in 1980 for the then South of Scotland Electricity Board (SSEB) and it was commissioned in 1988. It is a local landmark, highly visible from the A1 trunk road and East Coast Main Line railway.  

The power station is expected to be shut down in 2028, prior to defueling and then decommissioning.

History 
After extensive discussions with the local planning authority and more than twenty other interested organisations, the South of Scotland Electricity Board (SSEB) sought approval of the Secretary of State for Scotland in 1973 for Torness as a site for a nuclear power station. A public exhibition was held at Dunbar in February 1974 to explain the Board's proposals, and in June 1974, a public inquiry was held.

There was widespread public opposition to the building of a nuclear plant at Torness. Diverse campaigning groups came together to highlight the environmental and human cost of nuclear power stations. In May 1978, 4,000 people marched from Dunbar to occupy the Torness site. Many of them signed a declaration to “take all nonviolent steps necessary to prevent the construction of a nuclear power station at Torness”.

The SSEB submitted designs for four types of reactor then being considered by HM Government for the next stage of the UK civil nuclear programme: the advanced gas-cooled reactor (AGR), the Steam Generating Heavy Water Reactor (SGHWR), the Light Water Reactor (LWR) and the High Temperature Reactor (HTR). In February 1975, the Secretary of State for Scotland granted the SSEB statutory consent for the location of future nuclear power stations and, after review of the four alternative reactor types, consent was given on 24 May 1978 for construction of the AGR station.

The construction, which was undertaken by a consortium known as National Nuclear Corporation ('NNC'), began in 1980. The reactors were supplied by NNC, the boilers by NEI and the turbines by GEC.

Torness was the last of the United Kingdom's second generation nuclear power plants to be commissioned (25 May 1988).
The station consists of two advanced gas-cooled reactors (AGR) capable of producing a peak rating of 1,364MWe. Upon deregulation of the United Kingdom's electricity generation market it passed to the state-owned Scottish Nuclear, privatised as part of British Energy which was sold to the French company Électricité de France (EDF) in January 2009, and incorporated in the latter's UK subsidiary EDF Energy. It was expected to operate until 2030. Cracking is now expected to cause the closure of the plant in March 2028.

Plant design 

Torness shares its design with Heysham 2 nuclear power station. The station was designed by NNC, a company created from the gradual amalgamation of five consortia that were formed in the 1950s and 1960s to build the UK's commercial nuclear power stations. NNC is now part of Jacobs Engineering Group.

The graphite-moderated, gas-cooled design was proven at the WAGR – the Windscale experimental AGR facility – and is a significant evolution of the Magnox reactor designs.

When first operated Torness probably had the most sophisticated and complex computerised control system for a nuclear power station worldwide, and far more sophisticated than earlier members of the advanced gas-cooled reactor fleet. Over 70 Ferranti Argus 700 computers are used in the control and instrumentation systems, which included Digital Direct Control (DDC) of the reactors.

In 2020, the staff training simulator was replaced, partly to reflect plant upgrades and to simulate interactions between the two reactor systems and with auxiliary systems, and to provide modern simulation capabilities. The original reactor control system was unchanged.

Nuclear fuel for Torness power station can be delivered and removed via a loading/unloading facility on a branch from the adjacent East Coast Main Line.

Incidents

In November 1999, a Panavia Tornado F.3 of the Royal Air Force crashed into the North Sea less than 1km from the power station following an engine failure. The UK Ministry of Defence commended the two crew members for demonstrating "exceptional levels of airmanship and awareness in the most adverse of conditions", because they ensured that the Tornado was clear of the power station before abandoning the aircraft.

In May 2002, a gas circulator pump failed. Forensic evidence suggested an undetected fatigue crack in part of the impeller led to failure. In August, another gas circulator on the other Torness reactor showed signs of increasing vibration and was promptly shut down by the operators. Its subsequent disassembly revealed a fully developed fatigue related crack in a similar position to the first failure, but the prompt shutdown had prevented consequential damage.

In August 2005, screens within the seawater cooling intake system were completely blocked by seaweed. This possibility had been foreseen for the plant and preprepared plans were activated, leading to both reactors being shut down.

In June 2011, both reactors were manually shut down due to reduced flow of seawater after intakes were clogged by a large mass of jellyfish.

See also 

 Nuclear power in Scotland
 Nuclear power in the United Kingdom
 Energy policy of the United Kingdom
 Energy use and conservation in the United Kingdom
 James L. Gray (SSEB Chief Engineer)
 List of places in East Lothian

References

External links 
Heysham 2/Torness, Nuclear Engineering International wall chart, 1981
Account of visiting Torness by Charlie Stross
Torness page of operator EDF's website
Torness Visitor Centre which offers public tours of the facility

Buildings and structures in East Lothian
Energy infrastructure completed in 1988
Nuclear power stations in Scotland
Nuclear power stations using Advanced Gas-cooled Reactors
1988 establishments in Scotland